South Shelby High School is a school located in Shelbina, Missouri, United States. It is a part of the Shelby County R-IV School District.

It is home to the Cardinals and the LadyBirds. Students between the grades of 9-12 have attended this school in Northeast Missouri since it first opened it doors to students on November 23, 1965. The school was built  on 4154 Highway 36 at a geographically central location within the district and was the product of merging two separate school districts, Clarence and Shelbina.  A middle school was later built in the 90's connecting to the high school. South Shelby's current principal is Tim Maddex and Superintendent is Troy Clawson.

Involvement

Extra curricular 
The extra curricular activities that students can participate in, outside of sports, include the following: 

 AFS Intercultural Programs 
 Band 
 Choir 
 SS Extras 
 Environmental Club 
 Campus Bowl 
 Family, Career and Community Leaders of America (FCCLA) 
 Future Business Leaders of America (FBLA) 
 The National FFA Organization (FFA) 
 T.E.C.I.S. Yearbook 
 Student Council (StuCo) 
 Key Club 
 National Honor Society (NHS)

Athletics 
South Shelby has been able to achieve many awards from their high school athletic teams throughout their existence. They are a part of the Clarence Cannon Conference and are under the guidelines of Missouri High School Activities Association (MSHSAA). Here are a listing of some of the sports South Shelby has available. 

Archery
 Baseball 
 Basketball 
 Cheerleading 
 Cross Country (Girls)
 11 man Football 
 Flag Line 
 Golf 
 Dance
 Softball 
 Track and Field

Missouri State High School Athletic Association (MSHSAA) Records 
One South Shelby player has a current men's basketball MSHSAA record in the category 'Records Broken by a Single Person, During one Quarter'. Over a lapse of an entire season South Shelby holds a record for the most "Three-point Shots Made" accomplished 28 during the 2008–2009 season.

South Shelby's newest sport Cross Country started in 2009, but only for women. Due to MSHSAA regulation they were not able to add it as a men's sport otherwise another women's sport would have to be added to equalize the number of sports for both genders.

There are four elite men from South Shelby who have current records on the state level during a single football game. As an overall team with an entire season worth of statistics South Shelby is ranked number one on "Total Interceptions" with two during the 2006 season with a total of 33. In 2010 they also rank for the most sacks having 49 total. Lastly, they are tied on number eight of "Total Game Shutouts" in 2006.

Postseason Team Records

 State Champions-Football
 1970 Class 2-A
 2006 Class I
 State Runners Up-Football
 1971 Class 2-A
 1990 Class 2-A
 2011 Class I
State Semi-Finalists-Football
 1968 Class 2-A
 1969 Class 2-A
 1975 Class 2-A
 District Champions-Football
 1988
 1989
 1990
 1991
 2000
 2001
 2004
 2005
 2006
 2007
 2008
 2009
 2010
 2011
 2012
 2014
 2015
Boys State Basketball 3rd Place 
1990 Class II
Girls State Basketball Champions
1974 All Classes
Girls State Basketball Runners Up
1973 All Classes
2008 Class III
Girls State Basketball 3rd Place
1975 Class I
Girls District Cross-Country Champions
2008 Class II
Girls District Softball Champions
2015 Class II

Current South Shelby LadyBirds Head Softball Coach Angie Resa is on the MSHSAA records for "Coaching Victories" having 244 wins and 112 losses. Resa also coached at North Shelby during her coaching career. In 2015 the South Shelby Ladybirds became softball District Champions for the first time ever in school history, while playing against Kakoha on October 10. They won with a score of 4–2.

References

External links

 Home - Shelby County R-IV School District

Public high schools in Missouri
Shelby County, Missouri